Yasmin Lee is an Cambodian American transgender pornographic film actress and model. She appeared in the film The Hangover Part II as Kimmy.

Early life and career
Lee lived with her family in various refugee camps in Cambodia before emigrating to the United States.
She joined the U.S. Navy at age 18 but left soon after due to sexuality-based harassment to pursue a career as a drag performer and make-up artist.
She has twice been nominated for an AVN Award for her work in transgender pornography. 

A regular performer at Kink.com, she won in 2011 the "Kinkiest TGirl Domme" Award.

Mainstream appearances
Lee made her way into mainstream roles with special appearances on various TV shows, including The Maury Povich Show and The Tyra Banks Show. She appeared in the 2011 horror film Red Ice, the 2011 comedy The Hangover Part II, and the 2019 romance Loves Me, Loves Me Not.

Activism
In 2011, Lee appeared in a panel discussion on LGBT rights with the American Civil Liberties Union.

Awards and nominations
 2008 AVN Award nomination – Transsexual Performer of the Year
 2009 AVN Award nomination – Transsexual Performer of the Year

References

External links

 
 
 
 

Year of birth missing (living people)
Transgender pornographic film actresses
American pornographic film actresses
American LGBT military personnel
Cambodian emigrants to the United States
Living people
Transgender female adult models
Transgender military personnel
United States Navy sailors
American Civil Liberties Union people
American LGBT people of Asian descent
Transgender Erotica Award winners
American people of Cambodian descent